Erzi may refer to:

Erzi (rural locality), a rural locality (a selo) in Dzheyrakhsky District of the Republic of Ingushetia, Russia
Érzǐ, Pinyin rendering of the Chinese name of Sons (1996 film)
 Erzi Nature Reserve, (also Erzee) is a Russian 'zapovednik' (strict nature reserve)